Marcelo Ríos was the defending champion but did not compete that year.

Alberto Berasategui won in the final 6–3, 6–4 against Carlos Costa.

Seeds
A champion seed is indicated in bold text while text in italics indicates the round in which that seed was eliminated.

  Carlos Costa (final)
  Francisco Clavet (semifinals)
  Gilbert Schaller (second round)
  Bohdan Ulihrach (semifinals)
  Alberto Berasategui (champions)
  Andriy Medvedev (first round)
  Félix Mantilla (second round)
  Filip Dewulf (first round)

Draw

External links
 1996 Internazionali di Carisbo draw

Bologna Outdoor
1996 ATP Tour